Carimate is a comune (municipality) in the Province of Como in the Italian region Lombardy, located about  north of Milan and about  south of Como.

The municipality of Carimate contains the frazioni (subdivisions, mainly villages and hamlets) Cascina Valle-Stazione di Carimate and Montesolaro.

Carimate borders the following municipalities: Cantù, Cermenate, Figino Serenza, Lentate sul Seveso, Novedrate.

Carimate is served by Carimate railway station. One of the landmarks is the hotel and former castle, Castello di Carimate.

Among the local churches is the parish church of San Giorgio e dell'Immacolata Concezione.

Demographic evolution

References

External links
 www.comunecarimate.it/

Cities and towns in Lombardy